Aethelric or Æþelric was the fourth known king of the Kingdom of Bernicia which he ruled from 568 to 572.

Aethelric was one of the sons of Ida of Bernicia, founder of the kingdom. During his reign the Bernicians met the Britons in three important battles, the first on the offensive, the others on the defensive.

He was the father of Æthelfrith, who was the first monarch to rule both Bernicia and Deira, the two constituent parts of what came to be considered Northumbria.

Notes

External links
 

572 deaths
Anglo-Saxon warriors
Bernician monarchs
History of Northumberland
6th-century English monarchs
Year of birth unknown